"Turn On the Lights" is a song by American rapper Future, released on April 13, 2012 as the fourth single from his debut studio album Pluto. It peaked at number 50 on the US Billboard Hot 100, number two on the Hot R&B/Hip-Hop Songs chart, and number one on the Top Heatseekers chart, making it the album's most successful single. It is his second highest-selling single as a lead artist. Complex named the song number 14 on their list of the best 50 songs of 2012, and Pitchfork named it number 49 on their list of the top 100 tracks of 2012.

Commercial performance
The song peaked at number 50 on the US Billboard Hot 100 and number two on the US Hot R&B/Hip-Hop Songs charts. In April 2015, the song was certified platinum by the Recording Industry Association of America (RIAA) for sales of over a million digital copies in the United States.

Charts

Weekly charts

Year-end charts

Certifications

"Turn On the Lights again.."

"Turn On the Lights" was remixed by British producer Fred Again and Swedish house music supergroup Swedish House Mafia titled as "Turn On the Lights again..". It was released as a single on July 29, 2022 and charted in both the UK and Ireland, reaching No. 27 on the UK Singles Chart and No. 23 on the Irish Singles Chart. Clash described the remix as "a fiery return, melding together house, arena-level EDM, and aspects of UK garage", while Pilerats described it as "a dirty, rolling slice of garage inflected house music."

Charts

Weekly charts

Year-end charts

Certifications

References

2011 songs
2012 singles
2022 singles
Future (rapper) songs
Fred Again songs
Swedish House Mafia songs
Song recordings produced by Mike Will Made It
Songs written by Future (rapper)
Epic Records singles
Atlantic Records UK singles
Songs written by Marquel Middlebrooks
Songs written by Mike Will Made It